Andrew Paul MacDonald  (born 30 November 1958) is a Canadian classical composer, guitarist, conductor, and music educator. His compositions have been performed in many countries and recorded by well-known musical ensembles.

Early life and education
Born in Guelph, Ontario, MacDonald studied music theory and piano with Rosemarie Hamilton and guitar with Alexandre Lagoya, Michael Lorimer, Ray Sealey and Manuel Lopez-Ramos. He earned a Bachelor of Music from the University of Western Ontario in 1981 where he was a pupil of Arsenio Girón and Alan Heard. He pursued graduate studies in music composition at the University of Michigan (UM) where he earned both a Master of Music (1982) and a Doctor of Musical Arts (1985). At the UM he was a pupil of William Albright, William Bolcom, Leslie Bassett, and George Balch Wilson.

Career
In 1985 MacDonald returned to Canada.  He spent the next two years teaching in Manitoba and Quebec. In 1987 he joined the faculty at Bishop's University in Lennoxville, Quebec where as of 2015 he is chairman and professor of composition and electronic music. At the school he was instrumental in founding the Ensemble Musica Nova, an organization of which he is serves as the Artistic Director. From 1993 to 1997 he served as Vice-President and Council member of the Canadian League of Composers. In addition to teaching and composing, he remains active as a classical and electric guitarist and as a conductor.

Compositions
MacDonald's compositions have been performed in many countries including England, Norway, France, Germany, the Netherlands, Taiwan, Turkey, the United States and Australia, as well as in Canada by the Toronto Symphony Orchestra, l'Orchestre symphonique de Montréal, the Esprit Orchestra, l'Orchestre symphonique de Québec, the Winnipeg Symphony Orchestra, the Manitoba Chamber Orchestra, Symphony Nova Scotia, the Vancouver Symphony Orchestra, the CBC Vancouver Orchestra, the Calgary Philharmonic Orchestra, the Evergreen Club and the I Musici de Montréal.

MacDonald has had works commissioned by professional orchestras, chamber ensembles, solo performers, music competitions, the Canadian Opera Company and the Canadian Broadcasting Corporation. His works are frequently broadcast on CBC and Société Radio-Canada.  He has also had many of his compositions recorded on compact disc and has won prizes for his works, including the 2005 East Coast Music Award for Jasper Wood's recording of "Great Square of Pegasus", which also won the 2005 Independent Music Award, and the 1995 Juno Award for "Best Classical Composition" for his Violin Concerto.

In 2011 he collaborated with Michael Shamata at Pacific Opera Victoria to create a new opera based on Stephen Massicotte's play, Mary's Wedding.

Discography
2005:  For There and Then, The Evergreen Club 
2004:  Quintette à Vent Estria
2004:  The Great Square of Pegasus, Jasper Wood
2004:  Wild Honey, Timothy Steeves and Nancy Dahn
2000:  Premieres!, Arthur Campbell
1998:  Harbord Street, Trio Lyra
1998:  Among Friends, Trio des Iscles
1996:  20 years of resistance to genocide in East Timor
1995:  Canadian Music for Chamber Orchestra, Manitoba Chamber Orchestra
1993:  Orchestre Mondiale des Jeunesses Musicales
1991:  Music for the Open Air, Quatuor Claudel
1991:  Passage through Time

References
Citations

Further reading
Biographical articles on MacDonald are to be found in The New Grove Dictionary of Music and Musicians (2nd ed., 2001) and the Canadian Who's Who (annually since 1998).

External links
Andrew Paul MacDonald
The Daily Gleaner Press:Andrew Paul MacDonald

1958 births
Living people
University of Michigan School of Music, Theatre & Dance alumni
University of Western Ontario alumni
Canadian composers
Canadian male composers
Male conductors (music)
Canadian guitarists
Musicians from Guelph
Juno Award for Classical Composition of the Year winners
Academic staff of Bishop's University
Canadian male guitarists
21st-century Canadian conductors (music)
21st-century Canadian male musicians
Members of the Order of Canada